John Gray Lucas (1864–1944) was a lawyer and politician during the early 20th century. He was appointed assistant U.S. attorney in Cook County in 1934. Born in Marshall, Texas, in 1864, he eventually moved to Pine Bluff, Arkansas. He graduated from Branch Normal College of Arkansas Industrial University (now University of Arkansas at Pine Bluff). He then got his law degree from Boston University School of Law in 1887, graduating with honors as the only African-American student in his class.

Upon returning to Pine Bluff, he was appointed commissioner for the U.S. Circuit Court, Eastern District of Arkansas. In 1890, he was elected as a state representative for the Arkansas General Assembly. It was during this time, and amidst a growing level of racial tension across the south, that he delivered a speech in February 1891 demanding that Jim Crow Laws not be extended to the Arkansas railway system. Although the measure was passed, Lucas earned the admiration of his white counterparts.

Lucas left Arkansas for Chicago, Illinois, in 1893. He became known as an expert in criminal law, and held an office at 88 Dearborn Avenue in the Chicago Loop. He appeared before the United States Supreme Court four times.

He died in 1944 and is buried in Chicago's Lincoln Cemetery.

References

1864 births
1944 deaths
African-American lawyers
African-American state legislators in Arkansas
Lawyers from Chicago
Arkansas lawyers
University of Arkansas at Pine Bluff alumni
Boston University School of Law alumni
Members of the Arkansas House of Representatives
20th-century African-American people